Taungbauk or Taung Pauk is a village in Kyain Seikgyi Township, Kawkareik District, in the Kayin State of south-eastern Burma (Myanmar).

References

External links
Maplandia World Gazetteer

Populated places in Kayin State
Kyain Seikgyi Township